The Bulahdelah Tornado was an intense tornado which occurred near the town of Bulahdelah ( north-northeast of Newcastle), New South Wales on 1 January 1970, and is thought to be the most destructive tornado ever documented in Australia, however, no official rating has been made public.

It is estimated that the tornado destroyed over one million trees. A caravan was destroyed and a 2-tonne (2,000 kg) tractor was lifted into the air, landing upside down. The tornado was reported by witnesses as a swirling black cloud surrounded by flying debris, and producing a thunderous roaring sound. The weather system that produced the tornado was a classic set-up for violent tornadoes, something somewhat rarely seen outside of the United States, Canada, Argentina, Bangladesh, and adjacent areas of India.

See also 
List of tornadoes and tornado outbreaks
List of Southern Hemisphere tornadoes and tornado outbreaks
Australian Tornadoes - Past and Present

References

1970 in Australia
Tornadoes of 1970
Tornadoes in Australia
January 1970 events in Australia